The  is a lineup of full-size luxury cars and limousines produced mainly for the Japanese market, serving as Toyota's flagship car within Japan; globally the unrelated Lexus LS series is Toyota's flagship luxury model. Production of the Century began in 1967, and the model received only minor changes until redesigns in 1997 and 2018.

The Century derived its name from the 100th birthday of Sakichi Toyoda (born 14 February 1867), the founder of Toyota Industries. It is often used by the Imperial House of Japan, the Prime Minister of Japan, senior Japanese government leaders, and high-level executive businessmen. The Century is comparable in purpose to the Austin Princess/Daimler DS420, Cadillac Series 70, Mercedes-Benz 600 series, Chinese Red Flag, Rolls-Royce, and Russian ZIS/ZIL limousines.

The first-generation Century was available with only a V8 engine (the third post-war Japanese-built sedan so-equipped) at its introduction in 1967 until a full platform redesign in 1997. The second generation was only installed with a Toyota-designed and -built V12, an engine bespoke to the Century, until 2018, when the power-train reverted to a V8 with the addition of Toyota's hybrid technology.

While the Century is a premium, full-size luxury sedan, it is not available at Japanese Lexus dealerships; it can only be purchased at specifically identified Toyota Store locations.

The exterior styling of the Century has, with some modifications, remained unchanged since its introduction, primarily due to its perception as denoting conservative success. Its appearance is iconic in Asian countries and is usually painted black. The closest Japanese competitor was the Nissan President, with a similar status reputation although, during the 1960s and '70s, the high market positioning was also shared with the Mitsubishi Debonair. In the 1970s, two other Japanese competitors introduced large sedans — the Isuzu Statesman de Ville and the Mazda Roadpacer (both derived from General Motors-Australia products) — which were short-lived.

First generation (G20/G30/G40; 1967) 

The original Century was based on the 1964 Crown Eight, which featured the 2.6 L V8 Toyota V engine, and appeared almost two years after the October 1965 introduction of the 4-liter Nissan President. The design remained largely untouched during its 30-year production run, apart from minor cosmetic changes and engine upgrades. This appearance has also inspired the designs of subsequent versions, as it remains desired by its clientele.

The 1967 Century was equipped with an upgraded version of the Crown Eight engine, the 3.0 L 3V. 1973 saw the introduction of the 3.4 L 4V, replaced by the 4V-U two years later, benefitting from the installation of emission control technology Toyota called "TTC". Only column shifters were available at first, with a manual being the base option. The manually shifted versions (Type A and Type B) were discontinued in 1973 and August 1974 respectively. The 3.4-liter V8 received fuel injection in November 1978 (4V-EU), enabling the car to meet the 1978 Emissions Standards. This also meant that the chassis code was changed, to VG35. The engine was once again changed to the 4.0 L 5V-EU in November 1982 (VG40), along with an all-new exterior appearance. Note that the 3V, 4V, and 5V do not refer to the number of valves in the engine but simply denote model names in the Toyota V engine range. On the "C" pillar there is a badge in blue with a gothic-style "C" for Century with a label "V8" below.

In 1971, automatic climate control became available, an innovation. Along with the change of engine in April 1973 (VG21) a host of other changes took place. The electromagnetic locks were changed, the taillights were changed (now with amber turn signal lenses) as well as the inclusion of front disc brakes. In September 1987, the Century received another light makeover, changing from a hydraulically operated three-speed to an electronically operated four-speed automatic transmission. A floor-mounted shifter became available on a model called the D-type, which also had front bucket seats rather than a full-width bench. The grille received detail changes and the cornering lamps were integrated into the headlight surrounds.

During Japan's Bubble Economy, sales of the Century doubled (from 1,027 in 1985 to 2,117 in 1989). The Century sedan wasn't enough for those heady days, and in October 1989, the Century Limousine appeared. The Limousine also received a standard padded vinyl roof and an opera window in the centre pillar, where the stretch was placed. It also uses 150 mm wider rear doors, for a more balanced design and ease of entry. An annual production of 60 was planned. In December 1992, the Century received its last makeover, with some very minor changes taking place in late 1994.

A Century with a GT45 gas turbine and electric motor was shown as the Century gas turbine hybrid concept vehicle at the 1975 Tokyo Motor Show.

Chassis codes 
 VG20: 3.0 L 3V V8, 1967–1973
 VG21: 3.4 L 4V V8, 1973–1975
 VG30: 3.4 L 4V-U V8, 1975–January 1977
 C-VG30: January 1977–November 1978 (1977 Emissions Standards)
 E-VG35: November 1978–1982 (1978 Emissions Standards)
 VG40: 4.0 L 5V-EU V8, 1982–1997
 VG45: 4.0 L 5V-EU V8 (L-type) 1990–1997

Second generation (G50; 1997) 

The Century received a complete redesign in April 1997, although the new model was visually very similar to the previous generation. It was initially equipped with a 4-speed A342E automatic, until a 6-speed "intelligent" transmission arrived in 2005. It also features air suspension. The Century remains the first and only Japanese front-engine, rear-wheel-drive production car equipped with a V12, and it is Toyota's first V12 engine. As this is a top level luxury flagship, private owners are comfortable with the yearly road tax bill.

This generation no longer offered the ability to select which level of equipment preferred, designated as the D-Type, E-Type and the extended length L-Type of the previous generation, and changed to offering either a floor-mounted or column-mounted transmission selector. From 2003 through 2004, the V12 engine was briefly offered with the ability to use CNG fuel. On the "C" pillar there is a badge in blue with a gothic-style "C" for Century with a label "V12" below.

Although the previous generation was not officially exported despite its common use by Japanese diplomats overseas, Toyota began limited official exports of the G50 Century to Europe and other Asian markets including China and the Middle East in November 1998, positioning it as an executive car for company and government officials. About 100 left-hand drive cars were produced for export, with some going to the United States for promotional and testing purposes. Several were in use as corporate cars for Toyota's North American executives. , the G50 remains the only generation of the Century to have officially been exported and sold outside of Japan.

The Century was Toyota's most luxurious model at its inception in 1967, and maintained this status throughout the 20th century. Today, it is positioned above the Lexus line-up, and remained the most luxurious and prestigious model to wear the Toyota badge. The Century shared the role of flagship with the Crown Majesta and Celsior with almost identical dimensions to the Century but with a more modern approach and appearance that appealed to younger buyers, and both vehicles were exclusive to the Toyota Store dealership network in Japan. In contrast to other luxurious cars (such as the Maybach or Rolls-Royce), the Century has not been positioned and marketed as a sign of wealth or excess. Marketing literature states roughly that, "the Century is acquired through persistent work, the kind that is done in a plain but formal suit."

Like other cars in the top of the luxury class, the Century is designed with the rear passengers in mind. Hence, the rear seats recline and the front passenger seat (in right-hand drive cars only) has a fold-down center section so that a passenger in the back may stretch their feet forward. The rear seats are equipped with a massage system. The exterior door handles open the doors electrically since the sound of the door being opened mechanically is perceived as being "too obtrusive". The doors are equipped with a soft-close mechanism, allowing the door to pull itself completely closed electrically when the latch makes contact with the striker.

In Japan, the vehicles' interiors are usually ordered in wool cloth, rather than the leather seen in many luxury cars; leather is not as quiet as cloth when sat upon. The vehicle interior colors are limited to medium brown, light brown, burgundy, gray or royal blue inside, with a choice of five exterior colors including black. The Century is distinguished by different paint options than the rest of the Toyota line-up, and color choices have culturally significant names. The painting of each car is one of the most detailed in the manufacturing process. It involves hand painting, followed by wet sanding by hand, then hand polishing to a mirror finish. The Century has seven layers of paint used to complete the mirror like appearance. Vehicles primarily intended for livery service usually have leather interiors in gray, for easier interior cleaning and durability. White lace curtains are usually installed in the rear window, instead of tinted windows, which are perceived to attract unwarranted attention. Such passengers usually like to be seen in a Century, despite Asian tendencies for modesty.

In 2006, the G-BOOK vehicle telematics subscription service was added to the list of standard features.

The second generation Century was discontinued on 4 February 2017, after almost 20 years of production. 9,573 vehicles were built from 1996 (the launch year was 1997) to the final figure of 100 cars in 2016.

Century Royal (G51; 2006) 

The Toyota Century Royal is the official state car currently used by the Emperor of Japan, being a specially prepared Century, a one-off  custom car. The car was produced at the request of the Japanese Imperial Household Agency, to be used by senior members of the Imperial House of Japan. This special version has wool cloth upholstery, internal granite entry steps and Japanese washi rice paper headlining for the passenger compartment, as well as undisclosed security measures. The front passenger compartment is upholstered in leather. With the introduction of the third generation Century in 2018, the tail lights on the Century Royal are vertical, while the civilian Century maintains horizontal tail lights across the back of the vehicle.

Five vehicles were originally ordered, but due to the individual cost for each only four were built. According to the translation of the corresponding article on Japanese Wikipedia, one car called  is used by the Imperial Palace. Another was built as a hearse in 2008, known as Imperial 2, and was used for the funeral of Prince Mikasa 27 October 2016. Imperial 3 and Imperial 5, due to additional security equipment installed, cost  each, are assigned to the Ministry of Foreign Affairs. The designation "Imperial 4" is not used because the number 4 is considered unlucky. Each vehicle that is used for official transport is given a small round badge attached to the grille at the right with the kanji character for  along with an Arabic number.

The suspension consists of double wishbones for both the front and rear wheels, supplemented by air-bag support springs. For various state functions, additional conventional Century sedans are used with a designated "Imperial" number roundel.

This vehicle replaced the fleet of four 40-year-old Nissan Prince Royal limousines that were beginning to show their age. After the Prince Royals were no longer deemed appropriate by the Imperial Household Agency, the Emperor and Empress had been seen riding in a conventional Century until the Century Royals were ready for service. The Century Royal is exclusive to the Imperial Household and was presented for service on July 7, 2006. When the Emperor is riding inside, the Imperial Standard is displayed on the top of the grille. An additional roundel, known as the Imperial Seal of Japan is also displayed at both the front and rear of the car in place of a license plate, and on the exterior of both rear passenger doors, displaying a 16-petal chrysanthemum in golden colour, denoting the Chrysanthemum Throne of Japan.

The limousine stretches around 20 feet in length and 6.5 feet across, —the same length as a Maybach 62 and both longer and heavier than a 2003 Rolls-Royce Phantom. Previous Emperors were driven in a Nissan Prince Royal (1967–2008), Cadillac Series 75 (1951–1970), Mercedes-Benz 770 W07 Series (1932–1968), Rolls-Royce Silver Ghost (1921–1936), and a Daimler (1913–1927).

Chassis codes 
 GZG50: 5.0 L 1GZ-FE V12
 GZG50L: 5.0 L 1GZ-FE V12 (LHD export)
 GZG50R: 5.0 L 1GZ-FE V12 (RHD export)
 GZG51: 5.0 L 1GZ-FE V12 (Century Royal)

Third generation (G60; 2018) 

The third generation Century was unveiled at the October 2017 Tokyo Motor Show. The Century's production is limited to 50 per month, and is built in a "nearly hand-made" fashion. Unlike the previous generation, the G60 Century is no longer available outside of the Japanese market due to the G50's failure to sell overseas.

It shows that its appearance was influenced by the Century Royal, which was produced at the request of the Japanese Imperial Household Agency to be used by senior members of the Imperial House of Japan in 2006. The full model update maintains the visual tradition of the Century model, while incorporating appropriate technological upgrades and advances such as Toyota Safety Sense P-series collision avoidance support, and Toyota T-Connect. The traditionally installed side-view mirrors above the front wheels, a standard feature that started with the first generation, have been replaced with door mounted units, incorporating turn signal lights. Unlike other Toyota products, which have the Toyota badge, and hybrid installed vehicles with a separate "hybrid badge" with an additional Toyota or Lexus badge with a blue background, the Century has the traditional Fushichō badge and the word "Century" in block letters on the trunklid and does not carry the Toyota badge or designation. On the "C" pillar there is a badge in blue with a gothic-style "C" for Century with a label "hybrid" below. This badge is a traditional Century styling feature that first appeared in 1967.

There are many features that are exclusive to the Century. The grille is the classic narrow vertical chrome strips with a second layer underneath of interlocking circles that are also used for the turn signals used in the front bumper. The rear taillights are also a traditional appearance which debuted with the first generation in 1967. As with previous generations, rear passenger comfort and convenience is made a priority. The rear seats have a recline feature, with integrated heaters and massage function, as well as an adjustable power leg rest for the rear seat opposite the driver. The sound system comes standard with 20 speakers. A 20-inch LCD screen is installed for rear seat passengers that let occupants control many aspects and features as a convenience as well as playing video content. The standard upholstery fabric continues to be offered in three color choices using 100% wool with a unique heather pattern, with leather remaining available optionally in two different color combinations. Both upholstery choices include two different wood inlay selections. The transmission selector, which on previous generations was either floor mounted or steering column installed, is now only available on the floor.

The powertrain package is the same as the 2008-2017 Lexus LS 600h & LS 600h L; however, as the fifth-generation LS does not feature this powertrain, it is now unique to the Century. The suspension has been upgraded from the previous double wishbone to a multi-link suspension with supplemental air bags to further enhance ride quality. Toyota first displayed a hybrid engine in the Century at the 1975 Tokyo Motor Show in the Century gas turbine hybrid, with a GT45 gas turbine and electric motor.

Century GRMN 
On 18 September 2018, the website Japanese Nostalgic Car published an article showing photos of a factory appearance package for the Century, called Century GRMN (Gazoo Racing, tuned by the Meister of the Nürburgring). It is not clear whether this will be a one-off or not. On 20 September 2018, an article was published by Japanese website Response showing President of Toyota Motor Corporation Akio Toyoda getting into his modified Century, which did not appear to be the same as the conventional model currently available. The website suggested that a sport-oriented version of the Century might be offered soon. On 25 November 2018, the car appeared at the Toyota GAZOO Racing Festival, where it appeared alongside the fifth generation Supra. At the 2019 Tokyo Auto Salon, a Century GRMN appeared in black.

Royal Parade Car 
On 19 November 2018, the Imperial Household Agency announced a request to provide an open-top parade car for the Coronation Ceremony of Naruhito on 22 October 2019, which was postponed until 10 November 2019 due to Typhoon Hagibis. The parade has been traditionally called Shukuga Onretsu no Gi. Previously, the only parade car used by the Imperial Household Agency was a 1990 Rolls-Royce Corniche convertible, which had been found to be too old and needing repair to bring up to serviceability. The Imperial Household Agency had expressed a desire to have a Japanese automobile manufacturer provide a vehicle built specifically for this motorcade event, and released an official request. On 17 January 2019, it was announced that a Century, modified to the Emperor's specifications, would be provided in convertible form. On 19 September 2019, an image of the custom-built parade vehicle was released, showing a rare four-door convertible with rear conventional doors. The rear seats are  higher than those in the standard production hard-top, allowing parade spectators a better view of the imperial couple.

Chassis codes 
 UWG60: 5.0 L 2UR-FSE V8

Production transfer
From 1967 to 2020, the Century was assembled at the Higashi-Fuji plant (Susono, Shizuoka) owned by Kanto Auto Works and its successor Toyota Motor East Japan. On 10 December 2020, Toyota Motor East Japan ceased car production at Higashi-Fuji. Toyota moved the Century assembly operations to Toyota City's Motomachi plant.

See also 
 Official state car

References

External links 

  
 Toyota concept cars
 1975 Tokyo Motor Show
 Century Royal in an Escorted Convoy
 Another view of the Century Royal in another Escorted Convoy

Century
Cars introduced in 1967
1970s cars
1980s cars
1990s cars
2000s cars
2010s cars
2020s cars
Full-size vehicles
Luxury vehicles
Rear-wheel-drive vehicles
Flagship vehicles
Limousines
Hybrid electric cars
Partial zero-emissions vehicles
Cars of Japan
Retro-style automobiles